David or Dave Leadbetter may refer to:

Dave Leadbetter, Scottish/English politician
David Leadbetter (golf instructor), British golf instructor